CCMM may refer to:
 Charter Communications, an American company providing cable television, high-speed Internet, and telephone services. CCMM was its former stock symbol.
 Centre contre les manipulations mentales or Centre Roger Ikor, a French anti-cult association